Sucrose acetoisobutyrate (SAIB) is an emulsifier and has E number E444. In the United States, SAIB is categorized as generally recognized as safe (GRAS) as a food additive in cocktail mixers, beer, malt beverages, or wine coolers and is a potential replacement for brominated vegetable oil.

Chemistry 

SAIB can be prepared by esterification of sucrose with acetic and isobutyric anhydride.

Uses 
 Beverage emulsions - weighting agent
 Color cosmetics and skin care
 Flavorings (orange flavor)
 Fragrance fixative
 Hair care
 Horse styling products

References

External links
 InChem

Disaccharides
Food additives
Acetate esters
Isobutyrate esters
E-number additives